Llandewey is a settlement along the Yallahs River in Saint Thomas Parish, Jamaica.

An earthquake in 1692 caused severe damage to the town.

References 

Saint Thomas Parish, Jamaica